Parsko may refer to:

Parsko, Greater Poland Voivodeship, a village in the administrative district of Gmina Śmigiel, Poland
Parsko, West Pomeranian Voivodeship, a settlement in the administrative district of Gmina Barlinek, Myślibórz County, Poland

See also
Parski (disambiguation)